Birch Aquarium at Scripps (sometimes referred to as Scripps Aquarium or Birch Aquarium) is an aquarium and the public outreach center for Scripps Institution of Oceanography at the University of California, San Diego. Accredited by the Association of Zoos and Aquariums, Birch Aquarium at Scripps has an annual attendance of more than 439,000, including more than 40,000 school children, and features more than 3,000 animals representing 380 species. The hilltop site provides views of the Scripps Institution of Oceanography campus and the Pacific Ocean. The mission of the aquarium reads: "At Birch Aquarium at Scripps, we connect understanding to protecting our ocean planet".

History

The aquarium was established in 1903 after the Marine Biological Association of San Diego was created to conduct marine research in the local waters of the Pacific Ocean. (Its name was later changed to Scripps Institution of Oceanography to honor supporters Ellen Browning Scripps and E.W. Scripps, part of the Scripps family of newspaper pioneers.) The founders built and maintained a small public aquarium and museum to communicate their discoveries to the world.

The researchers outgrew their modest laboratory in the boathouse of the Hotel del Coronado and moved to a small laboratory at La Jolla Cove in 1905. Several years later, the association purchased  at La Jolla Shores for $1,000 at a public auction from the city of San Diego. The first permanent building at the new site was constructed in 1910. Today the Old Scripps Building is listed on the National Register of Historic Places.

In 1915, the first building devoted solely to an aquarium was built on the Scripps campus. The oceanographic museum was located in a nearby building. The institution's name changed to Scripps Institution of Oceanography in 1925 to recognize the growing faculty's widened range of studies.

The Scripps Aquarium-Museum opened in 1951 and named to honor former institution director T. Wayland Vaughan. The three-story facility served the institution for more than 40 years. Within a month of its opening, visitors from all 48 states had signed the guest book.

In 1985, the Stephen and Mary Birch Foundation started a fund-raising effort for a new aquarium by donating $6 million. JCJ Architecture of San Diego was selected as the design architect and in 1992, the current $14 million Birch Aquarium at Scripps opened its doors. UC San Diego donated the land. Birch Aquarium at Scripps celebrated its 20th anniversary in September 2012 by introducing a new visual identity.

Exhibits 
At , Birch Aquarium at Scripps is designed around a central lobby with entrances to exhibit areas. Display tanks contain  of seawater.

Hall of Fishes
Hall of Fishes features more than 60 tanks of Pacific fishes and invertebrates. The path along the Hall of Fishes follows the currents of the North Pacific Gyre, starting with tanks inspired by the Pacific Northwest, then tanks with organisms from California, followed by tanks with organisms from Mexico and Baja California, ending with tanks inspired by the Indo-Pacific.   The largest habitat is a  kelp forest tank. The tank can be viewed live online through the Kelp Cam.

ElasmoBeach

Just past the Boundless Energy courtyard, is ElasmoBeach. ElasmoBeach is a sandy bottomed outside tank based on the sea floor of La Jolla. This tank features various sharks and rays, including leopard sharks and pacific angelsharks.

Tide-Pool Plaza
Tide-Pool Plaza features three living tide pools where visitors can touch and learn about tide-pool animals with docents. Windows in the habitats provide up-close views of starfish, hermit crabs, sea cucumbers, lobsters, and other animals local to San Diego's tide pools. The tide pool overlooks La Jolla and the Pacific Ocean.

Seadragons & Seahorses
In this exhibit, the Birch Aquarium promotes sea dragon conservation. In this exhibition you’ll find a multitude of fishes in the seadragon family such as seahorses, pipefish, sea dragons, etc. The Birch Aquarium has focused on this species’ rehabilitation because of the impacts that climate change and poaching have on the ocean. 

The exhibit features more than a dozen seahorse species and their relatives, a special seahorse nursery, and hands-on activities for all ages about seahorse biology. Birch Aquarium at Scripps is a world leader in seahorse propagation, reducing the need for other zoos and aquariums to collect from the wild.

Oddities: Hidden Heroes of the Scripps Collections 
This unique place in the aquarium is widely inspired by a comic-book designed exhibit that displays the odd qualities of the ocean and its species. In collaboration with the Scripps Oceanographic Collections, they uncover the superpowers of aquatic creatures, ranging from armor to supersight to electricity and the inspiration it's offered to cinema, medicine, engineering, and more.

Beyster Family Little Blue Penguins 
The Beyster Family Little Blue Penguins exhibit is named after the long-time supporters, Beyster Family, who generously gifted $1 million to the Scripps Institution of Oceanography and Birch Aquarium. This exhibit features little blue penguins that live in an 18,000 gallon penguin lagoon that imitates the coast of Australia and New Zealand where the little blues live. It also includes a small amphitheater that allows guests to observe the penguins, as well as a “discovery cove” for children to get a closer look at these penguins.

Boundless Energy
This is an outdoor playground that celebrates the innovative ways we can use natural forces to power our lives. Interactive stations explore ways to harness renewable energy from the sun, the wind, and ocean motion. Visitors can expend their own "boundless energy" at a play area for kids in which stationary bikes, hand cranks, and a seesaw powers a whimsical water sculpture.

Awards and recognition 
Summer 2014 San Diegans vote Birch Aquarium at Scripps the Best Museum in San Diego in the annual A-List poll for the fourth year in a row.
Summer 2013 San Diegans vote Birch Aquarium at Scripps the Best Museum in San Diego in the annual A-List poll for the third year in a row.
Summer 2012 San Diegans vote Birch Aquarium at Scripps the Best Museum in San Diego in the annual A-List poll for the second year in a row.
Fall 2011 San Diegans vote Birch Aquarium at Scripps the Best Museum in San Diego in the annual 10News.com A-List poll. The aquarium was voted the #2 museum in 2008, 2009, and 2010.

References

External links

 Scripps Institution of Oceanography Website
 University of California, San Diego

Aquaria in California
Museums in San Diego
Scripps Institution of Oceanography
University of California, San Diego